Miroslav Josić Višnjić (15 December 1946 – 8 September 2015) was a Serbian writer and poet. He won numerous literary prizes, most notably NIN Prize 1990 for his novel Odbrana i propast Bodroga u sedam burnih godišnjih doba and Andrić Award in 1998. He died at the age of 69.

Selected works

Novels
 Odbrana i propast Bodroga u sedam burnih godišnjih doba
 Pristup u počinak
 Roman bez romana
 Svetovno trojstvo 
 Roman o smrti galerije

Short stories collections
 Kvartet
 Dvanaest godova

Poems
 Azbuka smeha

Essays
 Azbučnik prideva u srpskoj prozi 20. veka

Notes

External links
 "Reči i deca", Skica za portret Miroslava Josića Višnjića, Danas, 9–10 April 2005

1946 births
2015 deaths
Serbian male poets
Serbian male essayists
Serbian male short story writers
Serbian short story writers
Serbian novelists
Writers from Sombor
University of Belgrade Faculty of Philology alumni
Yugoslav dissidents